Koritno is a settlement in the Municipality of Bled in the Upper Carniola region of Slovenia.

References

External links 
Koritno at Geopedia

Populated places in the Municipality of Bled